WGLD (1440 kHz, "Mega 107.1") is a commercial AM radio station licensed to serve Manchester Township, Pennsylvania. The station is owned by VP Broadcasting.  It broadcasts a Spanish CHR radio format. The station's programming is also available via its 250-watt translator W296EA (107.1 MHz) and to listeners with an HD Radio receiver via a simulcast on the HD4 subchannel of Cumulus Media-owned FM 96.1 WSOX.

History
WGCB was first licensed on December 8, 1950. It originally was licensed to Red Lion, Pennsylvania.  It broadcast a Christian radio format and was owned by Red Lion Broadcasting.

John Harden Norris was the station's first manager.  In 1964, Norris went on a 15-minute diatribe against journalist Fred Cook. Cook, under Fairness Doctrine rules, requested a chance to rebut, and Norris refused, claiming the doctrine to be unconstitutional. A lawsuit (Red Lion Broadcasting Co. v. FCC) ensued, which Cook won.

Cumulus Media took control of the station after its purchase of Susquehanna Radio Corporation in 2006. Following the purchase, Cumulus renamed the corporation Radio License Holding SRC, LLC.

Cumulus sold the station to Major Keystone LLC on September 24, 2021.

On January 17, 2022 WGLD changed their format from sports to Spanish CHR, branded as "Mega 107.1" and was sold to VP Broadcasting.

Previous logo

References

External links

GLD
Radio stations established in 1950
1950 establishments in Pennsylvania
GLD
Contemporary hit radio stations in the United States